Cognisable offence and non-cognisable offence are classifications of crime used in the legal system of India, Sri Lanka, Bangladesh and Pakistan. Non-cognisable offences includes misbehavior, public annoyance etc, while cognisable offences are more serious crimes.

Definition 
Generally, cognisable offence means an offence in which a police officer has the authority to make an arrest without a warrant and to start an investigation with or without the permission of a court. By contrast, in the case of a non-cognisable offence, a police officer does not have the authority to make an arrest without a warrant and an investigation cannot be initiated without a court order. The police can file a first information report (FIR) only for cognisable offences. In cognizable cases police can make an investigation without prior permission of a magistrate. Cognizable cases are more serious than non-cognizable cases. Normally, serious offences are defined as cognizable and usually carry a sentence of 3 years or more.

For non Cognisable offense, community service register is registered instead of a first information report.

In India 
In India, crimes like rape, murder and theft are considered cognizable unlike crimes like public nuisance, hurt and mischief.  In general non-cognizable offences are bailable and placed under First Schedule of Indian Penal Code (IPC).
On 12 November 2013, the Supreme Court of India said it was mandatory for the police to register a First Information Report for all complaints in which a cognizable offence has been discovered.

Procedure 
The Section 154 in the Code of Criminal Procedure, 1973, of India states:

See also 
 Community service register
 First information report

References 

Law enforcement in India
Law enforcement in Pakistan
Law enforcement in Bangladesh